Asia Muhammad and Taylor Townsend were the defending champions, but Townsend chose not to participate whilst Muhammad chose to participate at the 2015 Prague Open instead.

Françoise Abanda and Maria Sanchez won the title, defeating Olga Ianchuk and Irina Khromacheva in the final, 6–1, 6–3.

Seeds

Draw

References 
 Draw

Boyd Tinsley Women's Clay Court Classic - Doubles